Sagalassa valida, the oil palm rootworm, is a moth in the family Brachodidae. It is found in Panama, Colombia, Peru, Guyana and Brazil.

References

Natural History Museum Lepidoptera generic names catalog

Brachodidae
Moths described in 1856